Mark Athorn (born 7 November 1967) is a former Australian rules footballer who played with Footscray, Fitzroy, Sydney and Carlton in the Australian Football League (AFL).

A defender, Athorn was used mostly in the back pocket but could also play as a tagger. After being recruited from East Keilor he started his league career at Footscray and played three seasons for the Bulldogs. He then spent a season each at Fitzroy and Sydney before crossing to his fourth and final club Carlton.

Although he spent most of the 1993 season in the reserves, where he was Carlton's 'Best and fairest' winner, Athorn played in the 1993 AFL Grand Final. He was given the task of tagging Michael Long who won the Norm Smith Medal. It was Athorn's last game of league football.

References

Holmesby, Russell and Main, Jim (2007). The Encyclopedia of AFL Footballers. 7th ed. Melbourne: Bas Publishing.

1967 births
Living people
Australian rules footballers from Victoria (Australia)
Western Bulldogs players
Fitzroy Football Club players
Sydney Swans players
Carlton Football Club players